Deruluft (or Deruluft) was a joint German-Soviet airline, established on 11 November 1921. Deruluft opened its first permanent airlink between Moscow and Königsberg (via Kaunas and Smolensk) on 1 May 1922. It started a new route between Berlin and Leningrad (via Tallinn) on 6 June 1928, and maintained both routes until 31 March 1936. Deruluft was a successful business, but terminated on 31 March 1937 due to the changed political situation.

Business
Deruluft handled mainly post and freight. An overview of transported persons, mail and freight from 1922 to 1931:

Fleet
Most of the aircraft used were German, and so was its organization until the 1930s. Its first aircraft were Dutch-built Fokker F.III's. Later German Junkers F13's were added to the fleet. At first, Deruluft carried only mail and officials, but on 27 August 1922 the service was opened to the public.
From 1929 onwards the early Fokker F.III's were replaced by Dornier Merkurs. Early 1931 the Tupolev ANT-9 was added.

 Albatros L 58
 Dornier Merkur
 Fokker F.II
 Fokker F.III
 Junkers F.13
 Junkers Ju 52
 Rohrbach Roland
 Tupolev ANT-9

Accidents and incidents
 On 31 January 1935, a Junkers Ju 52/3mge (D-AREN) crashed into a hill in rain and fog near Stettin, Germany (now Szczecin, Poland) en route to Moscow from Berlin, killing all 11 on board.
 On 7 March 1935, a Rohrbach Ro VIII Roland II (D-AJYP, Schönberg) crashed at Schievelbein, Germany (now Świdwin, Poland) due to structural failure, killing both pilots.
 On 6 November 1936, a Tupolev ANT-9 (URSS-D311, Yastreb) struck trees and crashed upside-down near Nemirovo, Volokolamsky District ( southwest of Volokolamsk) after several navaids failed, killing all nine on board. The aircraft was operating the Velikiye Luki–Moscow leg of a Königsburg (now Kaliningrad)–Moscow passenger service.

References

Bibliography

Davies, R.E.G. Aeroflot: An Illustrated History of the World's Largest Airline, 1992.

External links

 

Former Aeroflot divisions
Airlines of the Soviet Union
Defunct airlines of Germany
Germany–Soviet Union relations
Airlines established in 1921
Airlines disestablished in 1937
Defunct seaplane operators